This is a list of songs which reached number one on the Billboard Mainstream Top 40 chart in 2006.

During 2006, a total of 15 singles hit number-one on the charts.

Chart history

See also
2006 in music

References

External links
Current Billboard Pop Songs chart

Billboard charts
Mainstream Top 40 2006
United States Mainstream Top 40